Barton Hill is a village in North Yorkshire, off the A64 road, near Barton-le-Willows.

Barton Hill was served by Barton Hill railway station on the York to Scarborough Line between 1845 and 1930.

References

Villages in North Yorkshire